The President of Iran is the highest official elected by direct, popular vote, although the President carries out the decrees, and answers to the Supreme Leader of Iran, who functions as the country's head of state. Chapter IX of the Constitution of the Islamic Republic of Iran sets forth the qualifications for presidential candidates. Powers of the presidency include signing treaties and other agreements with foreign countries and international organizations, with Supreme Leader's approval; administering national planning, budget, and state employment affairs, as decreed by the Supreme Leader. The President also appoints the ministers, subject to the approval of Parliament.

Candidates have to be vetted by the Guardian Council, a twelve-member body consisting of six clerics (selected by Iran's Supreme Leader), and six lawyers (proposed by the head of Iran's judicial system and voted in by the Parliament).

The Guardian Council interprets the term supervision in Article 99 as "approbation supervision" which implies the right for acceptance or rejection of elections legality and candidates competency. This interpretation is in contrast with the idea of "notification supervision" which does not imply the mentioned approval right. The "evidentiary supervision", which requires evidences for acceptance or rejection of elections legality and candidates competency, is another interpretation of mentioned article.

References